Juliussen is a Norwegian surname. Notable people with the surname include:

Albert Juliussen (1920–1982), English footballer
Anders Juliussen (born 1976), Norwegian footballer
Lasse Juliussen (born 1986), Norwegian politician

Norwegian-language surnames